, is a Japanese professional footballer who plays as a midfielder for Omiya Ardija.

References

External links

1996 births
Living people
Japanese footballers
Association football midfielders
Omiya Ardija players
J2 League players